Eupithecia ochrovittata is a moth in the  family Geometridae. It is found in Afghanistan and the Transcaucasus (Georgia and Armenia).

References

Moths described in 1887
ochrovittata
Moths of Asia